Sundance "Sunny" Wicks is an American college basketball coach, currently the Head Coach of the University of Wisconsin-Green Bay Men's Basketball Team. Prior to that, he served 2 years as the head coach for the Missouri Western Men's Basketball Team. Wicks played at Northern State in college, then played in Sweden for the Södertälje Kings for one year, then spent eleven non-consecutive years as an assistant at four different colleges including Northern State, Colorado, Northern Illinois, and San Francisco. He also launched the Arizona Power Basketball Academy and worked as a skill-instructor and director from 2011 to 2015. Prior to that, he spent five months training NBA pre-draft prospects at the Impact Basketball Academy in Las Vegas. He trained athletes such as Kawhi Leonard, Marvin Bagley, Isaiah Thomas, Xavier Silas, and Alec Burks.

He is known for his outgoing personality, his comical metaphors, and his ability to "Bring the Juice."

Playing career

Northern State

Basketball
From 1999 to 2003, Wicks played basketball for Northern State in Aberdeen, South Dakota. He scored a total of 1,174 points and pulled in 665 rebounds, which is 10th all time at Northern State. He was named All-NSIC twice, all-Conference academic selection twice, and won the Clark Swisher Male Athlete of the Year once in the 2002–03 season. Also, he helped Northern State win two NSIC conference titles.

Track and Field
Wicks was an All-NSIC performer in the 400-meter hurdles twice.

Södertälje Kings
During the 2003–04 season, Wicks played for the Södertälje Kings in Sweden. He led he team in scoring and rebounding.

Coaching career

2004-06 Northern State (Assistant)
Wicks was a GA under legendary coach Don Meyer for two years as a graduate assistant.

2006-07 Colorado (Assistant)
Wick coached under another well-known coach, Ricardo Patton, at Colorado as an assistant. He was in charge of film exchange and editing, individual workouts, in-state recruiting, and Ricardo Patton Basketball Camps.

2007-11 Northern Illinois (Assistant)
Wicks served as an assistant coach for Northern Illinois for three years and one year as the associate head coach under Ricardo Patton.

2015-16 San Francisco (Assistant)
Sundance Wicks served as an assistant for San Francisco for one season under head coach Rex Walters. Also on the staff was Sundance's brother, Luke Wicks.

2016-18 Northern State (Assistant)
Wicks spent two seasons as an assistant coach for his alma-mater Northern State for two seasons under head coach Paul Sather. During the 2017–18 season, Northern State compiled a record of 36-4 and were national runner-ups in the 2018 NCAA Division II men's basketball tournament.

2018-2020 Missouri Western (Head coach)
On March 28, 2018, Wicks was named the fifth men's basketball head coach at Missouri Western. In his first season leading the Griffons, Wicks recorded a 12-18 (6-13 Conference) record. That was the best record for Missouri Western since the 2015–16 season. He has had one player make the All-Conference Second Team, Lavon Hightower, and had two players receive honorable mentions, Tyrell Carroll and Bryan Hudson.

In his second season, Wicks led the team to an 18–14 record, the best Missouri Western has had since their 2009–10 season. This included a win against a ranked opponent: Missouri Southern. They also had a home record of 12–1, losing only to number one ranked Northwest Missouri State by a score of 69–92. Tyrell Carroll received first-team ALL-MIAA and Will Eames became Missouri Western's first-ever Freshman of the Year.

2020-present Wyoming (Assistant)
On March 27, 2020, Wicks resigned from Missouri Western to join Jeff Linder at Wyoming as assistant coach.

Head coaching record

References

Date of birth unknown
Living people
American expatriate basketball people in Sweden
American men's basketball coaches
American men's basketball players
College men's basketball head coaches in the United States
Colorado Buffaloes men's basketball coaches
Green Bay Phoenix men's basketball coaches
Missouri Western Griffons men's basketball coaches
Northern State Wolves men's basketball coaches
Northern State Wolves men's basketball players
Northern Illinois Huskies men's basketball coaches
San Francisco Dons men's basketball coaches
Wyoming Cowboys basketball coaches
Year of birth missing (living people)